Hocheng Hong is a Taiwanese academic. He served as the Deputy Minister of the National Science Council of the Executive Yuan from 2012 to 2014 and is the current president of National Tsing Hua University. He is the younger brother of Hochen Tan.

References

Ministers of Science and Technology of the Republic of China
Living people
Academic staff of the National Taiwan University
Presidents of universities and colleges in Taiwan
Year of birth missing (living people)